Pak Chang-sik (born c. 1958) is a North Korean politician from the city of Chongjin in North Hamgyong province.  He has served continuously in the Supreme People's Assembly since 1986, beginning with the 8th session and continuing through the 9th, 10th, and 11th sessions.  He has also been Vice Chairman of the People's Committee of Chongjin since 1990. He has also reportedly worked for 30 years as a diver at the Rason marine cooperative, traveling throughout the country to participate in various construction projects including the Nampho Dam.

See also
Politics of North Korea

Notes

References
Yonhap News Agency.  "Who's who, North Korea," pp. 787–812 in 

Members of the Supreme People's Assembly
People from Chongjin
Living people
1958 births
Members of the 1st Central Committee of the Workers' Party of North Korea